Lect is a commune in the Jura department in Bourgogne-Franche-Comté in eastern France. The hamlet of Vouglans has been attached to Lect since 1822.

Population
The demographic increase after 1820 is due to the attachment of Vouglans to Lect in 1822. The large increase after 1960 can be explained by the construction of the dam, the reservoir of the hydro-electric power station of the Lac de Vouglans, which required a workforce of more than 500 for five years.

See also
Communes of the Jura department

References

Communes of Jura (department)